Modern Synthesis is the second studio album by English rock band Area 11. It was released on 1 July 2016 and has an 11-song track list similar to their previous album All the Lights in the Sky. The album was written and partially recorded in Italy from between in the Spring of 2016 and then recorded in England throughout the rest of the year of 2015 into early 2016 between the band's tours.

The writing process for this album was more collaborative than the band's other records, with Jonathan Kogan and Sparkles* sharing much of the work, and with band members Alex Parvis and Leo Taylor contributing. This album is the band's first to be partly distributed by a non-indie label: Cooking Vinyl.

Track list
Note: As a hidden track, the previously released single, "Override [B]" is placed in the pregap of the first track Override [C]. This track is exclusive to the CD release of the album.

Personnel

Area 11 
 
 Sparkles* – vocals; guitar; piano; synthesizer
 Alex Parvis – guitar; guitar; vocals
 Jonathan Kogan – bass guitar; vocals; guitar
 Leo Taylor – percussion; guitar; vocals

Additional musicians 
 Connie McGuinness Griffiths – vocals on "Panacea and the Prelogue"
 Megan Paschke – vocals on "Panacea and the Prelogue"
 Owen Piper – vocals on "Panacea and the Prelogue"

Production 
 Sparkles* and Leo Taylor – engineering
 Phil Davies – additional engineering
 Sparkles* and Phil Davies – mixing
 Tom Woodhead – mastering

Design 
 Daniel Houlb and Adam Davis – artwork
 Sparkles* – sleeve and booklet design; photography

Charts

References

2016 albums
Cooking Vinyl albums
Area 11 (band) albums